This article covers the results of leadership elections in the Reform Party of British Columbia, a political party in British Columbia, Canada.  The 1995 election occurred by mail-in balloting, using a preferential voting method.  The 1997 election occurred at a delegated convention.

1995 leadership election

(Results announced January 15, 1995.)

Jack Weisgerber
Ron Gamble
Wilf Hanni
Terry Milne 250
Joe Leong

(Note:  A total of 4,158 party members had the ability to cast a ballot.)

1997 leadership convention

(Held on October 30, 1997.)

Wilf Hanni elected on the second ballot, by 125 votes
Adrian Wade
John Motiuk eliminated on the first ballot

(Wilf Hanni was removed as party leader in June 1998, at the same time that former Social Credit Premier Bill Vander Zalm was chosen as the party's President.)

1999 leadership convention

(Held on November 13, 1999.)

Bill Vander Zalm acclaimed

Political party leadership elections in British Columbia